James Goodall Francis (9 January 1819 – 25 January 1884), Australian colonial politician, was the 9th Premier of Victoria. Francis was born in London, and emigrated to Van Diemen's Land (later Tasmania) in 1847, where he became a businessman. He moved to Victoria in 1853 and became a leading Melbourne merchant. He was a director of the Bank of New South Wales and president of the Melbourne Chamber of Commerce. He married Mary Ogilvie and had eight sons and seven daughters.

Francis was elected as a conservative for Richmond in 1859, and later also represented Warrnambool. He was seen as a leading representative of business interests. He was vice-president of the Board of Land and Works and Commissioner of Public Works 1859–60, Commissioner of Trade and Customs 1863–68 in the second government of James McCulloch and Treasurer in the third McCulloch government 1870–71. When the liberal government of Charles Gavan Duffy was defeated in June 1872, Francis became Premier and Chief Secretary.

Francis's government, like most of its predecessors, was dominated by the education and land issues, and by conflict between the Assembly and the Legislative Council. His government passed the 1872 Education Act, but was defeated when it tried to pass a bill establishing a procedure for resolving deadlocks between the two Houses. He resigned as a result in July 1874. He was later a minister without portfolio in the government of James Service in 1880. He retired from politics in 1884, declining a knighthood. He died in Queenscliff in 1884.

See also
Geoff Browne, A Biographical Register of the Victorian Parliament, 1900-84, Government Printer, Melbourne, 1985
Don Garden, Victoria: A History, Thomas Nelson, Melbourne, 1984
Kathleen Thompson and Geoffrey Serle, A Biographical Register of the Victorian Parliament, 1856-1900, Australian National University Press, Canberra, 1972
 Raymond Wright, A People's Counsel. A History of the Parliament of Victoria, 1856-1990, Oxford University Press, Melbourne, 1992

References

External links

1819 births
1884 deaths
Premiers of Victoria
Victoria (Australia) state politicians
19th-century Australian politicians
English emigrants to colonial Australia
Members of the Victorian Legislative Assembly
Treasurers of Victoria